Nipponerius is a genus of cactus flies in the family Neriidae.

Distribution
Japan.

Species
Nipponerius femoratus (Coquillett, 1898)

References

Brachycera genera
Taxa named by Ezra Townsend Cresson
Neriidae
Diptera of Asia